Vitalii Serhiyovych Mykolenko (born 29 May 1999) is a Ukrainian professional footballer who plays as a left-back for Premier League club Everton and the Ukraine national team.

Club career

Dynamo Kyiv
Born in Cherkasy, Mykolenko is a product of the Dynamo Kyiv youth sportive school.

He played for Dynamo in the Ukrainian Premier League Reserves and in August 2017 he was promoted to the senior squad team. Mykolenko made his debut in the Ukrainian Premier League for Dynamo Kyiv on 20 August 2017, playing in a winning match against Stal Kamianske. On 25 October 2018, Mykolenko made his debut in the UEFA Europa League, starting in Dynamo's 2–1 victory over Rennes at the Roazhon Park.

In the 2018-2019 season, Mykolenko was named the best young player in the Ukrainian Premier League.

Everton
On 1 January 2022, Mykolenko joined English side Everton on a four-and-half year deal until June 2026 for an undisclosed fee. The club assigned him the number 19 shirt. On 3 March 2022, as a gesture of goodwill, Mykolenko was named Everton captain for an FA Cup Fifth round match against Boreham Wood due to the on-going conflict between his country and Russia.

In March 2022, Mykolenko called out the captain of the Russia national football team, Artem Dzyuba, in an Instagram post and questioned why Dzyuba and his Russian teammates were “silent” while “peaceful civilians were being killed in Ukraine” in the 2022 Russian invasion of Ukraine.

On 8 May 2022, Mykolenko scored his first goal for Everton, a stunning volley from 25 yards in a 2–1 away victory against Leicester City in a Premier League fixture.

International career
Mykolenko represented Ukraine at all levels of youth football. He made his debut for the Ukraine national team at age 19, on 20 November 2018 in a friendly against Turkey, as a starter. Still eligible for youth football, Mykolenko just missed out on winning the 2019 FIFA U-20 World Cup – he was named to the eventual winner Ukraine squad for the tournament, but had to be withdrawn from the competition a few days later due to injury.

Career statistics

Club

International

As of match played 27 September 2022. Ukraine score listed first, score column indicates score after each Mykolenko goal.

Honours
Dynamo Kyiv
Ukrainian Premier League: 2020–21
Ukrainian Cup: 2019–20, 2020–21
Ukrainian Super Cup: 2018, 2019, 2020

Individual
Golden talent of Ukraine (Under-19): 2018
Golden talent of Ukraine (Under-21): 2019, 2020
Ukrainian Premier League Best young player: 2018–19

References

External links 

 Profile at the Everton F.C. website
 
 
 

1999 births
Living people
Sportspeople from Cherkasy
Ukrainian footballers
Association football fullbacks
FC Dynamo Kyiv players
Everton F.C. players
Ukrainian Premier League players
Premier League players
Ukraine youth international footballers
Ukraine under-21 international footballers
Ukraine international footballers
UEFA Euro 2020 players
Ukrainian expatriate footballers
Expatriate footballers in England
Ukrainian expatriate sportspeople in England
21st-century Ukrainian people